Sir Wilfrid Ayre (12 April 1890 – 11 August 1971) was a British shipbuilder and banker. With his brother Sir Amos Ayre, he co-founded the Burntisland Shipbuilding Company in 1918.

He was knighted in 1945.

References 

 "Sir Wilfrid Ayre", The Times, 13 August 1971, p. 13.

Knights Bachelor
1971 deaths
British shipbuilders
British bankers
British naval architects
Presidents of the Institution of Engineers and Shipbuilders in Scotland
1890 births